Giorgi Alaverdashvili (born 21 November 1987) is a Georgian footballer who plays for 1. SK Prostějov.

Honours  
Lokomotivi Tbilisi
Georgian Cup: Winner 2004–05

Šiauliai
Lithuanian Football Cup: Runner-up 2012–13

References

1987 births
Living people
Footballers from Tbilisi
Footballers from Georgia (country)
FC Lokomotivi Tbilisi players
FC Borjomi players
FC Samtredia players
FC Guria Lanchkhuti players
CS Gaz Metan Mediaș players
Liga I players
Expatriate footballers from Georgia (country)
Expatriate footballers in Lithuania
Expatriate footballers in Romania
Expatriate footballers in Poland
Expatriate sportspeople from Georgia (country) in Romania
FC Metalurgi Rustavi players
Zawisza Bydgoszcz players
Ekstraklasa players
FC Šiauliai players
Association football forwards